Mukim Kilanas is a mukim in Brunei-Muara District, Brunei. The population was 22,492 in 2016.

Geography 
The mukim is located in the southwestern part of the district, bordering Mukim Gadong 'B' and Mukim Kianggeh to the north-east, Mukim Lumapas to the east and south, Mukim Pengkalan Batu to the south-west and Mukim Sengkurong to the west and north.

Demographics 
As of 2016 census, the population was 22,492 with  males and  females. The mukim had 4,398 households occupying 4,332 dwellings.

Villages 
As of 2016, the mukim comprised the following census villages:

Since 2007, Kampong Bunut, Kampong Bunut Perpindahan, Kampong Madewa, Kampong Tasek Meradun and Kampong Telanai have also been included in the municipal area of Bandar Seri Begawan, the country's capital.

Infrastructures 
Sayyidina Hasan Secondary School is the sole secondary school in the mukim. It was established in 1994 and celebrated its silver jubilee in 2019. It is named after Hasan bin Ali, a grandson of prophet Muhammad and a prominent figure in Islamic tradition.

References 

Kilanas
Brunei-Muara District